Laya Raki (born Brunhilde Marie Alma Herta Jörns; 27 July 192721 December 2018) was a dancer and film actress popular in Germany in the 1950s and early 1960s. She also became an international star for her roles in British films and TV productions.

Biography
Laya Raki was born in Hamburg, Germany, to acrobat Maria Althoff, and her partner, acrobat and clown Wilhelm Jörns. As she was an admirer of the famous dancer La Jana and liked to drink raki, she assumed the stage name Laya Raki.

She attracted attention for the first time in 1947–1950 as a dancer in Frankfurt and other German cities. When she performed in Berlin, her star began to rise: her 38–23–36 figure (5.35 ft, 110 lbs) and erotic radiance became the talk of the town.

The film company DEFA engaged her for a small role as a dancer in the film The Council of the Gods, which went on to win two awards. One newspaper, the Berliner Morgenpost, wrote that she was a great dancer with an expressive face rich in nuances. In 1953 she danced in the film  ("Marriage for One Night"). In  ("Red Poppy") she plays the gypsy girl Ilonka, who acts opposite Viennese comic actor Hans Moser.

In 1954 she was lured to London by empty promises of film roles in the United Kingdom and in Hollywood. There, she found herself unemployed, but her situation made headlines that soon opened up opportunities. The J. Arthur Rank Film Company, which needed an exotic type for a film in New Zealand, received her with open arms. She was played the role of the Māori chieftain's seductive wife in The Seekers and created a worldwide stir by baring her breasts, 10 years before Rudi Gernreich's topless swimsuit made headline news.

After taking acting lessons in Hollywood, she appeared in several UK TV productions, including 39 episodes of the popular series Crane (1962–1965), which made her a well known actress. Raki starred as Halima, a Moroccan dancer and bartender, who is the partner of the title character, the bar owner and smuggler Richard Crane, played by Patrick Allen.

She appeared in revealing outfits in both film and in photographs, capturing men's attention like no other German showgirl of the 1950s. She modeled for postcards, pin-up photographs, and magazines all over the world. The Broadway columnist Earl Wilson noted her preference for scanty clothing: "You should have seen Laya Raki. Even if she is dressed, she looks like, as if she only wears the zipper and has forgotten the material". He placed photos of her in the first issue of "Earl Wilson's Album of Showgirls (1956)".

Her latter song was banned by a Nuremberg court who declared her ecstatic moaning was simulating sex.

At the age of 30, Laya Raki married Australian actor Ron Randell in London. "He is the best and most beautiful man of the world", she said. They remained married until his death in Los Angeles on 11 June 2005.

Laya Raki died peacefully on 21 December 2018 at age 91.

Filmography

References

External links

1927 births
2018 deaths
German film actresses
20th-century German actresses
German female erotic dancers
Actresses from Hamburg